St. Augustine College, St. Augustine's College, St. Augustine's University or variations may refer to:

In Africa 
St. Augustine's College (Cape Coast), Ghana
Augustine University Ilara, Epe, Nigeria
St Augustine College of South Africa, Johannesburg, South Africa
St. Augustine University of Tanzania
St. Augustine International University, Uganda

In the Americas 
National University of St Augustin of Arequipa, Arequipa, Peru
University of St. Augustine for Health Sciences, St. Augustine, Florida, U.S.
St. Augustine College (Illinois), Chicago, Illinois, U.S.
St. Augustine Preparatory School, New Jersey, U.S.
St. Augustine's University (North Carolina), U.S.
St. Augustine's College (Bahamas), New Providence, Bahamas

In Europe 
St Augustine's and Good Counsel College, New Ross, Ireland
St Augustine's Catholic College, secondary school in Trowbridge, England
St Augustine's College (Kent), Canterbury, Kent, England
St Augustine's College, Dungarvan, Ireland
St. Augustine's College (Malta)
St Augustine's College of Theology, Kent, England

In Oceania 
St Augustine's College, Cairns, Queensland, Australia
St Augustine's College, Sydney, New South Wales, Australia
St Augustine's College, Yarraville, Victoria, Australia (closed 1972)
University of San Agustin, Iloilo City, Philippines

See also
Colegio San Agustin (disambiguation)
Saint Augustine Elementary School (disambiguation)
St. Augustine High School (disambiguation)
St Augustine of Canterbury School (disambiguation)